Goffstown High School, located in Goffstown, New Hampshire, United States, serves the towns of Goffstown and New Boston. Goffstown High School had 1,106 students enrolled as of July 1, 2018. The student body consists of 48% male and 52% female students.

History
The high school was formerly located at 12 Reed Street in the center of Goffstown.  The structure, built in 1925, became the Upper Elementary School when the new high school was built.  Following the construction of Mountain View Middle School, the former high school building, which is listed on the National Register of Historic Places, was converted into senior housing, and is now known as The Meetinghouse at Goffstown. The present high school was built in 1963 to the designs of Alexander John Majeski.

Administration 
The school's principal is Frank McBride.

Athletics 

Goffstown High School competes in NHIAA Division 1. The following sports are offered at GHS:

Fall
Cross Country: Boys & Girls Varsity
Field Hockey: Varsity, Junior Varsity
Football: Varsity, Junior Varsity, Freshmen
Golf: Varsity, Junior Varsity
Soccer: Girls & Boys Varsity, Junior Varsity
Fall Spirit: Co-ed Varsity, Junior Varsity
Volleyball: Girls Varsity, Junior Varsity

Winter
Bowling: Co-ed
Alpine Ski Team: Boys & Girls Varsity
Basketball: Boys & Girls Varsity, Junior Varsity, Freshmen
Gymnastics: Varsity
Ice Hockey: Varsity, Junior Varsity
Winter Spirit: Varsity, Junior Varsity
Swimming: Boys & Girls Varsity
Indoor Track: Boys & Girls
Wrestling: Varsity, Junior Varsity

Spring
Baseball: Varsity, Junior Varsity
Lacrosse: Boys & Girls Varsity, Junior Varsity
Softball: Varsity, Junior Varsity
Tennis: Boys & Girls Varsity
Track: Boys & Girls Varsity
Volleyball: Boys Varsity, Junior Varsity

Notable alumni
Sandeep Parikh, actor, writer, and director

References

External links

High School
Schools in Hillsborough County, New Hampshire
Public high schools in New Hampshire